Das Boot: German U-boat Simulation is a submarine simulator game designed by Paul Butler & Rick Banks and published in 1990 for Amiga and MS-DOS systems by Three-Sixty Pacific.  It was inspired by the 1973 novel of the same name and its film adaption.

The player takes command of a German Type VII U-boat and plays missions against the Allies which involve combat against aircraft, anti-submarine warships, and other submarines. The game was touted to feature 256 VGA Color, 3D Views, and historical realism.

Gameplay

Release
The MS-DOS version was released on 3.5" floppy disks and came packaged with a copy of the novel of the same name.

Reception
Computer Gaming World in 1991 panned the game as a serious submarine simulator, noting several issues such a frustrating user interface, unrealistic mechanics, and limited information presented to the player compared to other games of the same genre. The magazine did, however, praise the game as an arcade-shoot-'em-up but warned fans of the movie to avoid the game.

References

External links 

History of Subsims
1990 video games
DOS games
Amiga games
Submarine simulation video games
Video games based on novels
Naval video games
Video games developed in Canada
World War II video games
Artech Studios games
Single-player video games